The 1914 Calgary municipal election took place on December 14, 1914 to elect a Mayor to a one year term and six Aldermen on a two-year term, to sit on the thirtieth Calgary City Council. Additionally a Commissioner, members for the Public School Board, members for the Separate School Board, two borrowing bylaws and a plebiscite on church taxation were included on the ballot.

There were six Alderman positions contested for a two-year term for the election as Edward Henry Crandell, Harold William Hounsfield Riley, Stanley Gordon Freeze, Thomas Alfred Presswood Frost, and William Ross Sr. were elected for two-year terms in 1913.

Background
The election was held under multiple non-transferable vote where each elector was able to cast a ballot for the mayor, commissioner and six ballots for Aldermen who were elected at-large with the city as one large district. Half of Calgary's twelve Aldermen were elected to two year terms each year.

Three votes on a question were present during the election, two borrowing bylaws to purchase the stockyards for $240,000 and contraction of a Fourth Street West subway below the Canadian Pacific Railway tracks for $195,147 both failed to garner the two-thirds support necessary. A Plebiscite on the taxation of church property failed to garner the required support of half of voters.

Voting franchise was open to all men or women listed on the City's assessment roll with real property valued over $400.

A single one-year Alderman position was opened on Council following Costello's resignation half way through his two year term to run for Mayor. The one-year Alderman term was to be a separate ballot, however on nomination day on December 7, 1914, Douglas Ralph Crichton was the only candidate to file a nomination for the position. Crichton was subsequently elected by acclimation for the one-year term.

Results

Mayor

Commissioner

Councillors

School board trustee

Public school board

Separate school board

Plebiscite

Stockyard purchase
Bylaw proposing to purchase the stockyards for $240,000, requiring two-thirds of eligible voters.
For - 2,655
Against - 2,165

Fourth street subway
Construction of a subway below the Canadian Pacific Railway tracks at Fourth Street West for $195,147, requiring two-thirds of eligible voters.
For - 2,769
Against - 2,049

Taxation of church property
Plebiscite on taxation of church property, requiring a majority of eligible electors.
For - 2,867
Against - 3,571

See also
List of Calgary municipal elections

References

Politics of Calgary
Municipal elections in Calgary
1914 elections in Canada
1910s in Calgary